The 1934 Giro d'Italia was the 22nd edition of the Giro d'Italia, organized and sponsored by the newspaper La Gazzetta dello Sport. The race was won by the Learco Guerra of the Maino team. Second and third respectively were the Italian riders Francesco Camusso and Giovanni Cazzulani.

Favourite Alfredo Binda retired during the 6th stage. Guerra took over the lead in the general classification from the climb specialist Francesco Camusso in the decisive time trial stage from Bologna to Ferrara.

Participants

Of the 109 riders that began the Giro d'Italia on 19 May, 52 of them made it to the finish in Milan on 10 June. Riders were allowed to ride on their own or as a member of a team; 52 riders competed as part of a team, while the remaining 66 competed independently. There were eight teams that competed in the race: Bianchi-Pirelli, Dei-Pirelli, Ganna-Dunlop, Gloria-Hutchinson, Legnano-Hutchinson, Maino-d'Alessandro, Olympia-Spiga, and Olmpique.

The peloton was primarily composed of Italians, but contained many French and Belgian riders. The field featured three former Giro d'Italia champions in five-time winner and current champion Alfredo Binda and single race winners, Francesco Camusso and Vasco Bergamaschi. Other notable Italian riders that started the race included Learco Guerra, Giuseppe Olmo, Remo Bertoni, and Domenico Piemontesi. Félicien Vervaecke, a Belgian rider who went on to achieve great success at the Tour de France, entered the race. Belgian Jef Demuysere was seen as a favorite to win the race after his victory in the Milan–San Remo earlier in the season.

Route and stages

Classification leadership

The leader of the general classification – calculated by adding the stage finish times of each rider – wore a pink jersey. This classification is the most important of the race, and its winner is considered as the winner of the Giro.

In the mountains classification, the race organizers selected different mountains that the route crossed and awarded points to the riders who crossed them first.

The winner of the team classification was determined by adding the finish times of the best three cyclists per team together and the team with the lowest total time was the winner. If a team had fewer than three riders finish, they were not eligible for the classification.

Il Trofeo Magno was a classification for independent Italian riders competing in the race. The riders were divided into teams based on the region of Italy they were from. The calculation of the standings was the same for the team classification. At the end of the race, a trophy was awarded to the winning team and it was then stored at the Federal Secretary of the P.N.P. in their respective province.

The rows in the following table correspond to the jerseys awarded after that stage was run.

Final standings

General classification

Foreign rider classification

Isolati rider classification

Mountains classification

Team classification

Il Trofeo Magno

References

Footnotes

Citations

G
Giro d'Italia
Giro d'Italia by year
Giro d'Italia
Giro d'Italia